Bengaard Peak is a prominent rock peak,  high, located  south of the Fazekas Hills, on the east side of the Queen Elizabeth Range. It was named by the Advisory Committee on Antarctic Names for Hans J. Bengaard, a United States Antarctic Research Program ionospheric scientist at Little America V, 1957.

References 

Mountains of the Ross Dependency
Shackleton Coast